Koyi may be,

Haji Qadir Koyi, a Kurdish poet
Koyi language